This is a list of films which have placed number one at the weekend box office in Romania during 2015.

Highest-grossing films

Furious 7 and Star Wars: The Force Awakens became the 3rd and 4th film to surpass the 10 million lei mark, also 2015 is the first year in which two movies have surpass that mark. Minions became the highest-grossing animated film in Romania.

See also 

 List of highest-grossing films in Romania
 List of Romanian films

References 

2014
2015 in Romanian cinema
Romania